Sir Alexander Mackenzie ( – 12 March 1820) was a Scottish explorer and fur trader known for accomplishing the first crossing of North America in 1793. The Mackenzie River is named after him.

Early life

Mackenzie was born in House in Stornoway in Lewis. He was the third of the four children born to Kenneth 'Corc' Mackenzie (1731–1780) and his wife Isabella MacIver, from another prominent mercantile family in Stornoway. When only 14 years old, Mackenzie's father served as an ensign to protect Stornoway during the Jacobite rising of 1745. He later became a merchant and held the tack of Melbost; his grandfather being a younger brother of Murdoch Mackenzie, 6th Laird of Fairburn.

Educated at the same school as Colin Mackenzie, the army officer and first Surveyor General of India, he sailed to New York City with his father to join an uncle, John Mackenzie, in 1774, after his mother died in Scotland. In 1776, during the American War of Independence, his father and uncle resumed their military duties and joined the King's Royal Regiment of New York as lieutenants. By 1778, for his safety as a son of loyalists, young Mackenzie was sent, or went accompanied by two aunts, to Montreal. By 1779 (a year before his father's death at Carleton Island), Mackenzie had a secured apprenticeship with Finlay, Gregory & Co., one of the most influential fur trading companies in Montreal, which was later administered by Archibald Norman McLeod. In 1787, the company merged with the North West Company.

Explorations

1789 Mackenzie River expedition to the Arctic Ocean
On behalf of the North West Company, Mackenzie journeyed to Lake Athabasca where, in 1788, he was one of the founders of Fort Chipewyan. He had been sent to replace Peter Pond, a partner in the North West Company. From Pond, he learned that the First Nations people understood that the local rivers flowed to the north-west. Thinking that it would lead to Cook Inlet in Alaska, he set out by canoe on the river known to the local Dene First Nations people as the Dehcho (Mackenzie River), on 3 July 1789. On 14 July he reached the Arctic Ocean, rather than the Pacific. Later, in a letter to his cousin Roderick, he called the waterway "the River Disappointment," since the river did not prove to be the Northwest Passage, as he had hoped. In fact the story is probably apocryphal, as Mackenzie's own and contemporary records merely refer to it as the "Grand River." The river came to be known as the Mackenzie River in his honour.

1792–93 Peace River expedition to the Pacific Ocean

In 1791, Mackenzie returned to Great Britain to study the new advance in the measurement of longitude. In the aftermath of the Nootka Crisis with Spain, he returned to Canada in 1792, and set out  to find a route to the Pacific. Accompanied by two native guides (one named Cancre), his cousin, Alexander MacKay, six Canadian voyageurs (Joseph Landry, Charles Ducette, François Beaulieu, Baptiste Bisson, Francois Courtois, Jacques Beauchamp), and a dog simply referred to as "our dog", Mackenzie left Fort Chipewyan on 10 October 1792, and travelled via the Pine River to the Peace River. From there he travelled to a fork on the Peace River arriving 1 November where he and his cohorts built a fortification that they resided in over the winter. This later became known as Fort Fork.

Mackenzie left Fort Fork on 9 May 1793, following the route of the Peace River. He crossed the Great Divide and found the upper reaches of the Fraser River, but was warned by the local natives that the Fraser Canyon to the south was unnavigable and populated by belligerent tribes. He was instead directed to follow a grease trail by ascending the West Road River, crossing over the Coast Mountains and descending the Bella Coola River to the sea. He followed this advice and reached the Pacific coast on 20 July 1793, at Bella Coola, British Columbia, on North Bentinck Arm, an inlet of the Pacific Ocean. Having done this, he had completed the first recorded transcontinental crossing of North America north of Mexico, 12 years before Lewis and Clark. He had unknowingly missed meeting George Vancouver at Bella Coola by 48 days.

He had wanted to continue westward out of a desire to reach the open ocean, but was stopped by the hostility of the Heiltsuk people. Hemmed in by Heiltsuk war canoes, he wrote a message on a rock near the water's edge of Dean Channel, using a reddish paint made of vermilion and bear grease, and turned back east. The inscription read: "Alex MacKenzie / from Canada / by land / 22d July 1793" (at the time the name Canada was an informal term for the former French territory in what is now southern Quebec and Ontario). The words were later inscribed permanently by surveyors. The site is now Sir Alexander Mackenzie Provincial Park and is designated First Crossing of North America National Historic Site. In 2016, Mackenzie was named a National Historic Person.

In his journal Mackenzie recorded the Carrier language for the first time.

Later life and family
In 1801, the journals of Mackenzie's exploratory journeys were published. He was knighted in the following year. He served in the Legislature of Lower Canada for Huntingdon County, from 1804 to 1808.

In 1812 Mackenzie, then aged 48, returned to Scotland, where he married 14-year-old Geddes Mackenzie, twin heiress of Avoch. They had two sons and a daughter. Her grandfather, Captain John Mackenzie of Castle Leod (great-grandson of George Mackenzie, 2nd Earl of Seaforth), purchased the estate of Avoch with money left to him by his first cousin and brother-in-law, Admiral George Geddes Mackenzie. Lady Mackenzie's father was a first cousin of the father of George Simpson, Governor of the Hudson's Bay Company. The Mackenzies lived between Avoch and London. He died in 1820 of Bright's disease, at an age of 56 (his exact date of birth unknown). He is buried at Avoch on the Black Isle.

Legacy
The Mackenzie River is named for him, as is Mackenzie Bay, and the municipality of Mackenzie, British Columbia.

There are a number of schools in Canada named after him, such as Sir Alexander Mackenzie Senior Public School in Toronto, Sir Alexander Mackenzie Elementary School in Vancouver, and Sir Alexander Mackenzie Elementary School in St. Albert. Also Sir Alexander Mackenzie School in the Bella Coola Valley, BC.

He is referenced in the 1981 folk song "Northwest Passage" by Stan Rogers.

The Alexander Mackenzie rose (Explorer Series), developed in 1985 by Agriculture and Agri-Food Canada, was named in his honour.

Between 1989 and 1993, the Mackenzie Bicentennial Sea-to-Sea Expeditions of Lakehead University attempted a segmented re-enactment of the journey between Montreal and Bella Coola, British Columbia, but was unable to complete the final overland  Grease Trail when its First Nation owners refused permission.

References

Bibliography
 
 
 Wade, Mark S. (1927). "Mackenzie of Canada". William Blackwood & Sons Ltd., Edinburgh & London 1927 ; complete online transcription.

External links 

 
 
 
 
 
 

18th-century explorers
1764 births
1820 deaths
Burials in Highland (council area)
Deaths from nephritis
Explorers of Canada
Explorers of the Arctic
Knights Bachelor
Members of the Legislative Assembly of Lower Canada
North West Company
North West Company people
People from Stornoway
Persons of National Historic Significance (Canada)
Scottish explorers of North America